"Beautiful Dreamer" is an American popular song written by Stephen Foster.

Beautiful Dreamer may also refer to:

Fictional characters
 Beautiful Dreamer (Marvel Comics), a Marvel Comics character
 Beautiful Dreamer, a comic book character and member of the Forever People

Film and television
 Beautiful Dreamer (2006 film), a 2006 American film
 Beautiful Dreamer: Brian Wilson and the Story of Smile, a 2004 documentary film
 Beautiful Dreamers, a 1990 Canadian film
 Urusei Yatsura 2: Beautiful Dreamer (1984), an anime film
 "Beautiful Dreamer", an episode of Touched by an Angel

Music
 Beautiful Dreamer (album), a compilation album of contemporary artists playing Stephen Foster songs
Beautiful Dreamers (album), a 2010 album by guitarist Bill Frisell featuring a version of the Stephen Foster song